Shorewell Park is a residential locality in the local government area (LGA) of Burnie in the North-west and west LGA region of Tasmania. The 2016 census recorded a population of 2008 for the state suburb of Shorewell Park.
It is a south western suburb of Burnie, Tasmania, which was established in the 1970s as a broadacre social housing area. The residential housing expanded in the 1980s and in 2012 the Tasmanian Government released a plan for the next 20 years.

The Hilltop Plaza Shopping Centre provides essential services such as a supermarket, bottle shop, hairdressing salon and pharmacy.

The Burnie Community House provides locals with assistance, training and opportunities. It has a market garden as one of its projects.

History 
Shorewell Park was gazetted as a locality in 1976. It had previously been named Cangort Park in 1974.

Geography
Cooee Creek forms the western boundary, and Shorewell Creek most of the eastern.

Road infrastructure
Route C110 (Mooreville Road) runs through from north to south.

Education 
Hellyer College
TAFE Tasmania

References

External links 
Hellyer College
TAFE Tasmania
Burnie Community House

Suburbs of Burnie, Tasmania